Katnip Kollege is a 1938 Warner Bros. Merrie Melodies cartoon directed by Cal Howard and Cal Dalton. The short was released on June 11, 1938.

Plot
In the "Swingology" classroom at Katnip Kollege, the Professor (a parody of Kay Kyser) requires each student to sing their lessons to a jazz rhythm, all the while singing "The Merry-Go-Round Broke Down". Johnny Cat just doesn't have it, and as a result, he has to stay after class wearing the dunce cap. Kitty Bright returns his fraternity ring as she leaves the room, telling him to call her when he learns how to swing.

That night, as all the other cats jam at an outdoor caterwaul, Johnny is suddenly inspired by the rhythm of a Pendulum clock. He runs to join the group and shocks everyone with a flawlessly jazzy rendition of "Easy as Rollin' Off a Log" sung (and trumpeted) to Kitty. At the end of the song the two cats actually roll off the log they were using as a stage, and Kitty covers Johnny's face with kisses. .

Voice Cast and Crew
Voice Cast
 Johnnie "Scat" Davis voices Johnny Cat
 Mabel Todd voices Kitty Bright
 George "Spanky" McFarland voices Mr. Jones
 Poley McClintock voices Frog Voice Vocal
 Singing Groups: Fred Waring's Glee Club

Crew Members
 Film Edited by Treg Brown (uncredited)
 Orchestration by Milt Franklyn (uncredited)
 Uncredited Animation by Rod Scribner, Volney White, Herman Cohen
 Visual Backgrounds Supervised by Art Loomer (uncredited)

Music
The music in the short is pieced together from a number of contemporary Warner Brothers features. The featured song, "Easy as Rollin' Off a Log", is written by M. K. Jerome and Jack Scholl and sung by Johnnie Davis and Mabel Todd in the 1937 film Over the Goal . Other songs used include "You're an Education" by Al Dubin and Harry Warren which was written for, but never used in Warner Brothers' 1938 feature film Gold Diggers in Paris and the Richard A. Whiting/Johnny Mercer song "We're Working our Way through College" from Warner Brothers' 1937 feature Varsity Show. Carl Stalling supervised the music soundtrack.

James Taylor’s music video “As Easy As Rolling Off A Log” contains clips from this cartoon, accompanied by Taylor’s recording sessions.

Home media
Though a frame of the original titles has been discovered, Warner Bros. does not restore frames or non-35mm prints, hence the Blue Ribbon titles were restored on the DVD copy.

LaserDisc - The Golden Age of Looney Tunes, Volume 1 (unrestored)
DVD - Looney Tunes Golden Collection: Volume 2, Disc 4 (interpositive restoration, SD)
DVD/Blu-Ray - Looney Tunes Platinum Collection: Volume 1, Disc 2 (restored in HD)
DVD/Blu-Ray - Looney Tunes Musical Masterpieces
DVD/Blu-Ray - The Adventures of Robin Hood (included as a bonus)

References

External links

1938 films
Merrie Melodies short films
Warner Bros. Cartoons animated short films
Films directed by Cal Dalton
Films scored by Carl Stalling
1938 animated films
1930s Warner Bros. animated short films
Films set in schools
1930s English-language films